David Radclyffe Guard (19 May 1928 – 12 December 1978) was an English first-class cricketer. A right-handed batsman who made his first-class debut for Hampshire in the 1946 County Championship against Yorkshire, Guard made five appearances for Hampshire in the 1946 season.

In 1947 Guard made his debut for the Combined Services against Worcestershire. This was Guard's only first-class appearance in 1947. The following season Guard made a single first-class appearance for Hampshire against Oxford University.

In 1949 Guard played eight first-class matches for Hampshire, with his final match for the club coming against Sussex in the same season. In total Guard played fifteen first-class matches for Hampshire, scoring 405 runs at a batting average of 15.57, with two half centuries and a high score of 89 which saved Hampshire from probable defeat against Glamorgan in 1949.

Guard's final first-class match came in his second and final match for the Combined Services in 1949 against Hampshire.

Guard died suddenly at Hartfield, Sussex on 12 December 1978.

External links
David Guard at Cricinfo

1928 births
1978 deaths
People from Romsey
English cricketers
Hampshire cricketers
Combined Services cricketers